Felix Möller (born 4 September 2002) is a Swedish handball player for IK Sävehof and the Swedish national team.

He is the younger brother of fellow handball player Simon Möller, and son of earlier handball player Peter Möller. He was born in Germany because his father was playing for the German team HSV Hamburg at the time.

Achievements 
 Swedish Handball League
Winner: 2021
 Swedish Handball Cup
Winner: 2022

References

External links
 Felix Möller at European Handball Federation

2002 births
Living people
Swedish male handball players
IK Sävehof players
21st-century Swedish people